The Carlsbad 1907 chess tournament was one of four well-known international chess tournaments held in the spa city of Carlsbad (Bohemia, then Austria-Hungary Empire). The other tournament years were 1911, 1923 and 1929.

The 1907 tournament was held at the Kurhaus (Kaiserbad) imperial bath hotel. Twenty-one great masters, under the direction of Viktor Tietz, played from August 20 to September 17, 1907.

The results and standings:

{|class="wikitable" style="text-align: left"
! # !! Player  !! 1 !! 2 !! 3 !! 4 !! 5 !! 6 !! 7 !! 8 !! 9 !! 10 !! 11 !! 12 !! 13 !! 14 !! 15 !! 16 !! 17 !! 18 !! 19 !! 20 !! 21 !! Total
|-
| 1 || align=left | ||x ||½ ||½ ||0 ||½ ||½ ||1 ||1 ||1 ||½ ||1 ||1 ||0 ||1 ||1 ||1 ||1 ||½ ||1 ||1 ||1 || 15
|-
| 2 || align=left | ||½ ||x ||0 ||½ ||½ ||½ ||½ ||1 ||1 ||½ ||1 ||½ ||1 ||1 ||1 ||½ ||1 ||½ ||1 ||1 ||1 || 14½
|-
| 3 || align=left |  ||½ ||1 ||x ||½ ||0 ||1 ||½ ||1 ||½ ||½ ||½ ||1 ||½ ||1 ||1 ||½ ||½ ||1 ||1 ||0 ||1 || 13½
|-
| 4 || align=left |  ||1 ||½ ||½ ||x ||1 ||½ ||½ ||½ ||½ ||½ ||0 ||0 ||½ ||0 ||1 ||½ ||1 ||1 ||1 ||1 ||1 || 12½
|-
| 5 || align=left |  ||½ ||½ ||1 ||0 ||x ||½ ||0 ||½ ||0 ||½ ||½ ||½ ||½ ||1 ||1 ||1 ||½ ||1 ||1 ||1 ||1 || 12½
|-
| 6 || align=left |  ||½ ||½ ||0 ||½ ||½ ||x ||1 ||1 ||½ ||1 ||0 ||1 ||1 ||1 ||0 ||½ ||1 ||1 ||1 ||0 ||0 || 12
|-
| 7 || align=left |  ||0 ||½ ||½ ||½ ||1 ||0 ||x ||0 ||1 ||1 ||½ ||½ ||1 ||1 ||½ ||½ ||0 ||½ ||½ ||1 ||1 || 11½
|-
| 8 || align=left |  ||0 ||0 ||0 ||½ ||½ ||0 ||1 ||x ||0 ||0 ||½ ||1 ||1 ||1 ||1 ||1 ||1 ||1 ||1 ||1 ||0 || 11½
|-
| 9 || align=left |  ||0 ||0 ||½ ||½ ||1 ||½ ||0 ||1 ||x ||½ ||½ ||0 ||0 ||½ ||1 ||1 ||½ ||1 ||1 ||1 ||½ || 11
|-
| 10 || align=left |  ||½ ||½ ||½ ||½ ||½ ||0 ||0 ||1 ||½ ||x ||½ ||½ ||1 ||1 ||1 ||½ ||1 ||0 ||0 ||½ ||½ || 10½
|-
| 11 || align=left |  ||0 ||0 ||½ ||1 ||½ ||1 ||½ ||½ ||½ ||½ ||x ||1 ||½ ||0 ||0 ||½ ||0 ||0 ||1 ||1 ||1 || 10
|-
| 12 || align=left |  ||0 ||½ ||0 ||1 ||½ ||0 ||½ ||0 ||1 ||½ ||0 ||x ||1 ||0 ||1 ||1 ||0 ||1 ||0 ||1 ||1 || 10
|-
| 13 || align=left |  ||1 ||0 ||½ ||½ ||½ ||0 ||0 ||0 ||1 ||0 ||½ ||0 ||x ||0 ||1 ||½ ||0 ||1 ||1 ||1 ||1 || 9½
|-
| 14 || align=left |  ||0 ||0 ||0 ||1 ||0 ||0 ||0 ||0 ||½ ||0 ||1 ||1 ||1 ||x ||0 ||½ ||1 ||0 ||1 ||1 ||1 || 9
|-
| 15 || align=left |  ||0 ||0 ||0 ||0 ||0 ||1 ||½ ||0 ||0 ||0 ||1 ||0 ||0 ||1 ||x ||1 ||1 ||1 ||0 ||1 ||1 || 8½
|-
| 16 || align=left |  ||0 ||½ ||½ ||½ ||0 ||½ ||½ ||0 ||0 ||½ ||½ ||0 ||½ ||½ ||0 ||x ||1 ||1 ||0 ||½ ||½ || 7½
|-
| 17 || align=left |  ||0 ||0 ||½ ||0 ||½ ||0 ||1 ||0 ||½ ||0 ||1 ||1 ||1 ||0 ||0 ||0 ||x ||0 ||1 ||0 ||1 || 7½
|-
| 18 || align=left | ||½ ||½ ||0 ||0 ||0 ||0 ||½ ||0 ||0 ||1 ||1 ||0 ||0 ||1 ||0 ||0 ||1 ||x ||1 ||1 ||0 || 7½
|-
| 19 || align=left |  ||0 ||0 ||0 ||0 ||0 ||0 ||½ ||0 ||0 ||1 ||0 ||1 ||0 ||0 ||1 ||1 ||0 ||0 ||x ||1 ||1 || 6½
|-
| 20 || align=left |  ||0 ||0 ||1 ||0 ||0 ||1 ||0 ||0 ||0 ||½ ||0 ||0 ||0 ||0 ||0 ||½ ||1 ||0 ||0 ||x ||1 || 5
|-
| 21 || align=left |  ||0 ||0 ||0 ||0 ||0 ||1 ||0 ||1 ||½ ||½ ||0 ||0 ||0 ||0 ||0 ||½ ||0 ||1 ||0 ||0 ||x || 4½
|}

References

Chess competitions
Sport in the Kingdom of Bohemia
Sport in Karlovy Vary
Chess in Czechoslovakia
1907 in chess
1907 in Austria-Hungary
20th century in Bohemia
August 1907 sports events
September 1907 sports events